

G
 
 
 
 
 
 
 

Ga

 
 
 
  (/)
 
 
 
 
 
 
 
 
  (/)
  (/)
 
 
 
 
  (/, /)
  (//, /)
 
  (//)
  (/)
 
  (//)
 
 
  (/, /)
 
  (/)
 
 
  (/)
 
 
 
 
 
 
 
 
  (/)
 
 
 
 
 
  (/)
 
 
 
 
 
 
 
 
 
  (/)
 
 

Gea–Gen 

 
 
 
 
 
 
 
 
 
  (/)
  (/)
  (/)
 
 
 
 
 
  (/)
  (/)
 
  (/)
  (/)
 
  (/)
 
 
 
 
  (/)
 
 
  (/)
  (/)
 
 
  (/)
  (/)
 
  (/)
  (/)
  (/)
 
  (/)
 
  (/)
 
  (/)
  (/)
  (/)
  (/)
 
 
 
 
 
 
 
 
 
  (/)
  (/)
  (/)
  (/)
 
 
 
  (/)
 
 
 
  (/)
 
  (/)
  (/)
  (/)
  (/)
  (/)
 
 
  (/)
  (/)
  (/)
 
 
 
 

Geo–Get 

 
 
 
 
 
 
 
 
 
 
  (/)
 
  (///)
 
 
 
 
 
 
 
 
  (1845)
 
 
 
 
 
 
 
  (/)
 
  (/)
  (/)
 
  (/)
  (/)
 
 
 
 
 
 
 
 
 
 
 
 

Gh–Gn 

 
  (/)
 
 
 
  (/)
 
 
 
 
 
  (/)
  (/)
 
  
  
 
 
  (//, /)
  (/)
 
 
  
 
 
 
 
 
 
 
 
 
 
 
 
 
 
 
 
  (/)
  (/////)
  (/)
 

Go

 
 
  (/)
  (/)
 
 
 
  (/)
 
  (///)
 
 
 
 
 
  (/)
 
 
 
 
 
 
 
 
 
  (//)
 
 
 
  (/)
 
 
 
 
 
 
 
 
 

Gr

 
  (/)
 
 
 
  (/)
 
  (/)
 
 
  (/)
 
  (/)
 
  (/)
  (/, /)
 
 
 
  (1864)
 
 
 
 
 
  (/)
  (/)
 
 
  
  (/)
  (/)
  (/)
 
 
 
 
  (/)
 
 
  (/)
 
  (/)
 
 
 
 
 
 
 
 
 
  (//)
 
 
 
 
 
 
 
 
 
 
 
  (/)
 
 
  (//)
 
 
 
  (/)
 
 
 
 
  (/)
 
 
  (/)
 
 
 
  (//)
  (/)
 
 
  (//)
 
 

Gu–Gy 

  (/)
 
 
  (/)
 
 
 
  (/)
 
  (///)
  (//)
 
 
  (/)
 
 
 
  (/)
 
 
 
 
 
  (//)
  (/)
 
  
 
  (/)
 
 
 
 
 
 
 
  (//)
  (//)
  (//)
 
 
 
 

H
 
 
 
 
 
 
 
 
 
  
 

Haa–Han 

 
 
  (/)
 
  (/)
 
 
 
 
 
 
  (/)
 
  (/)
 
 
 
  (/)
 
  (//)
 
 
  (/)
 
 
 
  (/)
  (/)
 
  (/)
 
 
  (/)
 
  (//)
 
  (//)
 
 
 
  (/)
 
  (/)
 
 
 
 
 
  (/)
  (/)
 
 
 
 
  (/)
 
 
 
  (/)

Har–Haz 

 
 
 
 
  (/)
  (/)
 
  (///)
 
 
  (/)
  (/)
  (/)
 
 
  (/)
 
  (/)
 
 
 
 
 
  (/)
  (/)
 
 
 
 
  (/)
  (//)
  (/)
  (/)
 
 
  (/)
 
 
 
  (/)
 
 
 
  (/)
 
 
  (/)
 
 
 
  (/)
 
 
  (/)
  (/)
  (/)
 
 
  (/)
 
  (/)
 
  (/)
 
 
  (/, /)
 
 
  (/)
  (/)
 
 
  (/)
  (/)
  (/)
 
 

He

 
 
  (1903, /)
 
  (1869)
 
 
 
  (/)
  (//)
 
 
 
 
 
 
  (/)
 
 
 
 
 
 
 
 
 
 
 
 
 
  (/)
  (//)
  (//)
 
  (/)
 
 
 
 
 
 
 
 
 
 
 
 
  
  (//)
  (/)
 
 
  (/)
  (/)
 
  (/)
 
  (/)
 
 
  (/)
 
 
 
 
 
 
 
  (/, /)
 
 
 
 USS Herreshoff No. 313 - never taken over by the Navy
 
 
 
 
  (/)
 
 
 
 
  (/)
 
 
  (/)
 

Hi

  (/)
 
 
 
 
 
 
  (/)
  (/)
 
 
 
 
 
 
  (/)
 
 
 
 
 
 
  (/)
 
 
 
 
 
  (/)
 
  (/)
 
  (/)
 

Ho

 
 
 
 
 
  (/)
 
 
 
 
  (/YTB-146/YTM-146)
  (//)
  (//)
 
 
  (/)
  (//)
 
  (//)
 
  (/)
 
  (/)
 
 
 
 
  (/)
 
 
 
 
 
 
 
 
 
 
 
  (/)
  (/)
  (//)
 
  (/)
  (/)
 
  (/)
  (//)
 
 
  (/)
  (/)
  (/)
  (1790s)
 MV Hos Bluewater
 MV Hos Gemstone
 MV Hos Greystone
 MV Hos Silverstar
  (/)
  (/)
 
 
 
 
  (/)
 
 
  (/)
  (//)
 
 
 
 
 
 
 
  (/)
 
 
 
 
 

Hu–Hy 

  (/)
  (/)
 
 
 
 
 
  (///)
 
  (///)
  (/)
 
  (/)
  (/)
 
 
 
 
 
  (/)
  (/)
  (/)
 
 
 
 
 
  (/)
 
 
 
 
 
  (/)
 
 
 
 
  (/)
 
 
 
  (//MSS-19)
 
 
 
 

References

Primary
 Dictionary of American Naval Fighting Ships, G
  Naval Vessel Register, G

Secondary
 navy.mil: List of homeports and their ships
NavSource Naval History